Verkhny Saydys (Üstügi Saydıs) is a rural locality (a settlement) in Mayminsky District, the Altai Republic, Russia. The population was 3 in 2016.

Geography 
Verkhny Saydys is located 47 km southeast of Mayma (the district's administrative centre) by road. Sredny Saydys is the nearest rural locality.

References 

Rural localities in Mayminsky District